Mark Allen Boggs (born May 7, 1964) is a former American football offensive tackle who played one game for the Indianapolis Colts. He was a replacement player.

References

Living people
1964 births
Indianapolis Colts players
American football offensive tackles
Ball State Cardinals football players
National Football League replacement players